"Non ho l'età (per amarti)" (Italian for "I'm not old enough (to love you)"), usually given as just "Non ho l'età", was the winning song in the Eurovision Song Contest 1964, held in Copenhagen. It was performed in Italian by Gigliola Cinquetti representing . Like all previous Italian Eurovision entries, the song had also won that year's Sanremo Music Festival. Cinquetti was sixteen years old, making her the youngest Eurovision winner in history until  when 's Sandra Kim won the contest with "J'aime la vie" – initially claiming to be fifteen, it was later revealed that Kim was only thirteen. In , the EBU made a new rule requiring contestants to be aged 16 or older before the contest; this age rule still operates.

The song was performed twelfth on the night, following 's António Calvário with "Oração" and preceding 's Sabahudin Kurt with "Život je sklopio krug". By the close of voting, it had received 49 points, placing it first in a field of 16.

"Non ho l'età" became a considerable commercial success for Cinquetti, in Italy, the rest of Europe, Scandinavia and other countries worldwide; she also recorded the song in English ("This is my prayer"), Spanish ("No tengo edad"), French ("Je suis à toi"), German ("Luna nel blu"), and Japanese ("Yumemiru omoi"). The song has since been recorded by a wide range of artists in other languages, for example, in Icelandic as "Heyr mína bæn" by Ellý Vilhjálms. Lili Ivanova, a famous Bulgarian singer, and Hong Kong singer Rebecca Pan, covered the song in 1964. Polish-Belarusian singer  covered the song in Polish ("Nie wolno mi").  made a Finnish cover ("Liian nuori rakkauteen"). Sandra Reemer recorded the song in Dutch ("Als jij maar wacht").

It was followed as Italian representative that year by Bobby Solo with "Se piangi, se ridi".

In , she co-hosted the contest in Rome alongside Toto Cutugno.

Cinquetti was proved not to be a UK 'one-hit-wonder' when an English recording of her 1974 Eurovision entry (titled "Go") reached #8 in the UK chart.

Charts

Linda Scott's version

Linda Scott's recording of the song's English version, "This Is My Prayer", was released as the B-side of the single "That Old Feeling" in late 1964. In the Philippines, it topped the national chart for 12 straight weeks beginning on 12 December 1964.

References

Eurovision songs of 1964
Eurovision songs of Italy
Eurovision Song Contest winning songs
Sanremo Music Festival songs
Number-one singles in Italy
Number-one singles in France
Italian-language songs
Songs written by Nicola Salerno
Ultratop 50 Singles (Flanders) number-one singles
1964 songs
Songs written by Mario Panzeri
Gigliola Cinquetti songs